Ross Township, Ohio may refer to:
Ross Township, Butler County, Ohio
Ross Township, Greene County, Ohio
Ross Township, Jefferson County, Ohio
Ross Township, Wood County, Ohio (defunct)

See also
Ross Township (disambiguation)

Ohio township disambiguation pages